Jim McNeill is a former scientist and British polar explorer, presenter and keynote speaker, with over 36 years of experience travelling and working in the polar regions.

In 2001 McNeill founded Ice Warrior Project, an organisation which gives "ordinary" people the opportunity to become modern-day polar explorers and achieve extraordinary feats of endurance and endeavour on purposeful, worthwhile expeditions of a citizen science nature.  Through Ice Warrior Project he develops people, discovers change and delivers stories to global audiences in a way we can all understand, fostering a much better understanding of the world we live in and on; ultimately helping us to survive.

Early life and education 
Born in 1960, in Chipping Barnet, North London, James Edward McNeill is the middle son of Irish immigrant, Richard McNeill and English nurse, Ann Elizabeth McNeill (née Bright). He describes his upbringing as “humble”, living for most of his formative years on a council estate in the Underhill region of Barnet.

McNeill attended Queen Elizabeth's Boys’ School in Barnet where he was not interested in matters academic and, instead, he concentrated on sporting prowess and disruptive practical jokes. Hoping to improve his academic performance, in 1977 his school sent him on a winter Outward Bound Course located in the heart of the Lake District, at Eskdale. Here, despite his youth (aged 16 years), he was put in charge of Young Patrol where he excelled in every aspect of outdoor pursuits, being described as a “bold and fearless climber, he proved to be very tenacious when faced with difficulties and persevered until they were overcome”. This early experience ignited Jim's passion for the outdoors and has led him to be an active rock climber and mountaineer ever since becoming a callout member of several mountain rescue teams in the military, Lake District and Scotland and also a mountaineering instructor for London Borough of Harrow and London Borough of Barnet, Youth and Communities instructing groups of underprivileged youths including their participation in the Duke of Edinburgh Award Scheme.

Career 
Despite scraping enough A levels to attend university he chose, instead, to write to 17 scientific establishments for a position in science. A week later he was employed by The Grassland Research Institute, Hurley, Berkshire where he worked in soil science identifying agricultural practices effecting ammonia volatilization from urea, groundwater pollution and ozone depletion over Antarctica as a result of ammonium nitrate fertilisers.

With a career spanning environmental science, the British Army, marketing communications and fire & rescue services (where he specialised in road traffic accidents and spent 10 years as a fire officer for the Royal Household) McNeill has selected, trained and led highly successful teams from top-level corporations, through high risk polar expeditions, to critical lifesaving situations where effective leadership and hands-on teamwork are paramount. He has a passion for leadership and getting the very best performance out of individuals and teams, at any level.

Polar and Expedition Career 

He has trained and guided many groups to the Polar Regions, including BBC film crews. He has clocked up hundreds of days solo travel, travelling as a safety consultant for film crews and living and learning from the Inuit covering thousands of miles either on foot, skis, snowmobile, by yacht or by dog sled. His expeditions have taken him to the Antarctica via the Southern Ocean (South Orkney Islands), mainland Canada, mainland Norway, Svalbard, Baffin Island, Cornwallis Island, Bathurst Island, Ellesmere Island and the Arctic Ocean for his attempts to reach the North Pole of Inaccessibility.

He spent over 170 days during the course of three separate expeditions on Ellesmere Island; (i) to the Geomagnetic North Pole via Sverdrup Pass from Eureka up the eastern coast to the Darling Peninsula (ii) following a pack of eight wolves and (iii) following three adults and six cubs on both occasions with a BBC film crew.

Since 2001 at his base in Resolute Bay and more recently since 2010 at his base in Longyearbyen, Svalbard Jim annually trains ordinary people to become polar competent. To date he has trained over 400 people and led 7 flagship expeditions.

Northern Pole of Inaccessibility 
McNeill has attempted to reach the Northern Pole of Inaccessibility on two occasions. In 2003, he contracted a flesh-eating disease (Necrotising Fasciitis) in his left ankle and was unable to leave base camp in Resolute Bay, Canada. His second attempt in 2006 was thwarted by disintegrating sea ice, some 130 miles into the journey on Day 17.

Safety, Logistics and Performance Training Consultancy 

Jim has been credited for his roles as safety consultant adviser, trainer and expedition leader on numerous television and film productions including BBC - Frozen Planet, BBC - Human Planet, BBC Natural World, Channel 4 - Predators in Paradise and Marvel Entertainment - Captain America. He was the expedition leader for BBC Scotland - The Last Explorers series following in the footsteps of William Spiers Bruce which involved a crossing of the infamous Southern Ocean via Drake's Passage with Neil Oliver in a yacht called Pelagic skippered by Skip Novak

He has delivered performance development to clients such as National Police Improvement Agency, PwC, BT Openreach and the Irish Rugby Football Union (national team).

McNeill has spoken to many business audiences at Blenheim Palace, the Barbican London, Lloyd's of London, and the Royal Albert Hall.

Citizen Science 
McNeill expeditions give him regular opportunities to monitor polar bear populations for the Norwegian Polar Institute, as well as putting together a yearly scientific program for scientists to monitor the effects of climate change. He is Vice president - Arctic Expeditions for Sea Research Society.

He has presented to the former president of Bolivia, Evo Morales at the Bolivian Indigenous People's Climate Change Conference.

Icons Interviewed 

Jim is host of the Icons Interviewed series of intimate events featuring iconic people Jim has some connection with.

So far he has interviewed Sir David Attenborough, Sir Ranulph Fiennes OBE, David Means OAM, Pat Falvey, Sir Chris Bonington CVO, CBE & DL, Felicity Aston MBE, Sir Robin Knox-Johnston CBE & RD and Alexandra Shackleton (grand daughter of Ernest Shackleton) at venues such as The Natural History Museum, The Royal Geographic Society, The Royal Aeronautical Society and HQS Wellington.

Personal life 
In 1980 he married Dr Ann McNeill (née Jukes) - they had two daughters, Kirsty and Helen, and two grandchildren, Lachlan and Louis. He was later married to Lorraine McNeill (née Moore) - they had a son, Mac. Jim now lives with his wife Sam McNeill (née Clifford) in Princetown, Dartmoor, Devon UK where together they run Ice Warrior Project.

References

Video 
 Training in the Northwest Passage 
 Solo Arctic Ocean

External links

Official Website
Jim McNeill on Facebook
Jim McNeill on Instagram
Jim McNeill in Twitter

British polar explorers
English explorers of North America
Explorers of Canada
Explorers of the Arctic
Living people
1960 births